Wilbur Wilde (born Nicholas Robert Aitken on 5 October 1955) is an Australian saxophonist, television personality and radio presenter. He is best known for his work on Hey Hey It's Saturday. He rose to prominence with the bands Ol' 55 and Jo Jo Zep & The Falcons.

Career

Music career
Wilde was the tenor saxophonist (and did some vocals) with Ol' 55 from 1975 until 1977. Wilde then joined Jo Jo Zep & The Falcons in 1977 as saxophonist and backing singer. He still remains in that role to this date.

Television career
He is most famous for appearing as part of the house band on Hey Hey It's Saturday from 1984 until 1999, and again from 2009 until 2010.

Wilde has made numerous other TV appearances throughout his career on shows including The Flying Doctors, MDA, The Paul Hogan Show, Blankety Blanks, Sale of the Century, Celebrity Squares, MTV, Getaway, Postcards, Prisoner, Temptation, Spicks and Specks, The Russell Gilbert Show, and commercials for the Australian Pensioners Insurance Agency. From 1992 to 1999, Wilbur toured with The New Rocky Horror Show, contributing to more than 750 performances along the way. His CV also boasts a string of movie credits including Trojan Warrior, Mad Max, The Coolangatta Gold, City of the Damned, Jenny Kissed Me, Dead End Drive-In, and Cool Change.

Radio career
Between 2000 and 2004, Wilde presented the Classic Cafe on Gold 104.3 Melbourne. In December 2005, Wilde joined Vega 91.5, hosted a drive show between 3 - 6pm. departing the station in 2008. Wilde also previously presented radio shows at 3UZ and 3XY.

Personal life
Wilde is a supporter of the Melbourne Football Club in the Australian Football League. His brother, Chris Aitken, played fourteen games for them in the 1960s and 1970s.
He plays golf at the National.

References

External links
 

1955 births
Australian saxophonists
Male saxophonists
Australian rock keyboardists
Australian television personalities
Australian radio personalities
Living people
Musicians from Melbourne
Musicians from Sydney
Rock saxophonists
Jo Jo Zep & The Falcons members
Ol' 55 (band) members
20th-century saxophonists
20th-century Australian male musicians
20th-century Australian musicians
21st-century saxophonists
21st-century Australian male musicians
21st-century Australian musicians